The first theatre in New York City to bear the name The Winter Garden Theatre had a brief but important seventeen-year history (beginning in 1850) as one of New York's premier showcases for a wide range of theatrical fare, from variety shows to extravagant productions of the works of Shakespeare. Initially known as Tripler's Hall or Metropolitan Hall, it burned down in 1854 and was rebuilt as The New York Theatre. Although it burned to the ground several times, it rose from the ashes under different managers, bearing various names, to become known as one of the most important theatres in New York history.

Showcase 
Some of the leading actors and theatre managers of the 19th century worked at The Winter Garden Theatre, from Jenny Lind and Laura Keene to Dion Boucicault and Edwin Booth. One of the most significant and politically influential productions in American theatre history took place on a single night at The Winter Garden Theatre on November 25, 1864, when three sons of one of America's great tragedians, Junius Brutus Booth, namely Junius Brutus Booth Jr., Edwin Booth, and John Wilkes Booth staged a benefit performance of Shakespeare's Julius Caesar to raise funds to build a statue of Shakespeare in Central Park; four months later John Wilkes would assassinate Abraham Lincoln in Washington D.C. as he cried out the historic words of Brutus in ancient Rome.  Throughout its seventeen-year history, The Winter Garden Theatre played a significant role in the history of the American theatre.

Groundbreaking

The theatre was originally planned in 1850 for the first engagement of the famous singer from Sweden, Jenny Lind, known as the "Swedish Nightingale". Located at 667 Broadway, New York, across from Bond Street just south of Amity Street (today's West Third Street), the new theatre was to be "one of the largest musical halls in the world," boasting one of the largest stages in New York.

 
Delays in construction meant that the theatre wasn't finished in time for Lind's first show.  She arrived to great fanfare and a reported gathering of over 40,000 (all arranged by her manager, P. T. Barnum), but without the theatre being built for her; instead, Miss Lind opened at New York City's Castle Garden.  The theatre that was to have opened with "the name of Jenny Lind [that] would attract attention all over the country", was instead later opened and was christened Tripler Hall, thereafter playing numerous minstrel shows, an entertainment then quite fashionable on the American stage.

There were a few notable exceptions to these theatrical diversions, demonstrating that Tripler Hall had a more legitimate reputation during this period.  In December 1850 an important ceremonial meeting was attended by thousands of Freemasons of New York City at Tripler Hall, of which it was written: "the event was regarded and still is regarded [1899] as a landmark in the history of Freemasonry in the history of New York." In February 1852 a memorial service was held at Tripler Hall for the renowned American novelist James Fenimore Cooper, presided over by the noted statesman Daniel Webster, with a eulogies said by Washington Irving, and William Cullen Bryant. That same year William Thackeray concluded a national tour with a lecture at Tripler Hall.

The theatre went through several different managers during this period, each manager naming the theatre as he or she pleased.  When the theatre was used for the American Art-Union Prizes Distribution, a report in The Illustrated London News gave an interesting description of the interior of Tripler Hall:

"Never - not even on the nights of the "Nightingale" - has the capacity of Tripler Hall been more fully booked than the evening appointed for the distribution of the Art Union prices.  The immense floor (30 feet wider than Kester Hall), the aisles, the galleries before the stage, and beside the doors, were crowded to excess."

On May 15, 1855, the theatre passed to new management with a musical by John and Morris Barnett called Monsieur Jacques, and was renamed Metropolitan Hall, and managed by John Lafarge, owner of the famed Lafarge House which adjoined the theatre.

Laura Keene

On December 27, 1855, the actress and manager Laura Keene reopened the theatre as Laura Keene's Varieties with Old Heads and Young Hearts.

Here the leading female impresario of New York produced an eclectic form of entertainment which she would perfect in subsequent productions such as the musical Seven Sisters five years later.

A rare etching of the interior of the theatre at this time depicts a production by Laura Keene in her theatre;  From the point of view of the stage, it depicts what is probably the production of a classical text, with two figures in historical costumes standing downstage close to the footlights. This etching, from the actors' point of view, gives a rare glimpse into theatrical production on the American stage in the pre-Civil War era.
 
Despite the success of the theatre under the management of Laura Keene, the Panic of 1857 bankrupted the theatre and it was forced to be closed once again.

This house was reopened Sept. 8, 1856 as Burton's New Theatre, managed by William Evans Burton, with The Rivals. In 1858, Joseph Jefferson performed in the burlesque Mazeppa by F. A. Brady in which he was drawn across the stage atop a Crandall horse.

Dion Boucicault

During the summer of 1859, the daring actor–playwright–manager Dion Boucicault, called "the most conspicuous English dramatist of the 19th century", tried his hand at management, took over the theatre, and gave the theatre its final name of The Winter Garden Theatre with the opening of his original burlesque Chamooni III on October 19, 1859.  The theatre was aptly named The Winter Garden because Boucicault remodeled the theatre extensively, surprisingly cutting the auditorium in half and installing "artificial tropical plants after a Parisian prototype."  Boucicault effectively turned the theatre into a "winter garden" in the fall of the year. Among Boucicault's stable of first-rung actors were Joseph Jefferson, Agnes Robertson, and Mrs. John Wood.  Boucicault's dramatization of Charles Dickens's Christmas story Cricket on the Hearth was his opening production, starring Jefferson as Caleb Plummer and Robertson as Dot; this immensely popular production eventually toured, as one critic has said, to "every possible playhouse in English-speaking America."

The Octoroon
That winter, on December 5 of 1859, Boucicault premiered one of his most popular - and controversial - melodramas The Octoroon, subtitled "Life in Louisiana", which he had adapted from the novel The Quadroon by Thomas Mayne Reid.  The Octoroon, dealing with people of mixed white and African heritage, caused nothing short of a sensation, to see on the stage a drama that provoked discussions about race and politics.  About this new phenomenon, The New York Times wrote that it had become "the great dramatic sensation of the season":

Everybody talks about the Octoroon, [sic] wonders about the Octoroon, goes to see the Octoroon; and the "Octoroon" thus becomes, in point of fact, the work of the public mind...the public having insisted on rewriting the piece according to its own notions, interprets every word and incident in wholly unexpected lights; and, for aught we know, therefore, the "Octoroon" may prove after all to be a political treatise of great emphasis and significance, very much to the author's amazement.

The newly named Winter Garden Theatre eventually became home to a series of musical extravaganzas and burlesques: Cinderella with music by Charles Koppitz and a text by Charles Dawson Shanley on September 9, 1861, The Wizard's Tempest by Charles Gayler, on June 9, 1862, and King Cotton by Charles Chamberlain on June 21, 1862.

Edwin Booth

On February 21, 1863, Edwin Booth took on the management of the Winter Garden Theatre (together with his brother-in-law, John Sleeper Clarke) with the intention of shifting the focus from musicals and burlesques to classical dramas.  This enterprise  included a toga-clad, one-night production of Julius Caesar on the evening of November 25, 1864, Evacuation Day, played by Edwin and his brothers, John Wilkes Booth and Junius Brutus Booth Jr.

The goal of staging Julius Caesar for just one night was to raise funds for the establishment of a statue of William Shakespeare designed by John Quincy Adams Ward in the relatively new Central Park on the northern outskirts (then) of Manhattan.  Tickets went for sale for a (then) astounding price of five dollars. Considering the way history was to unfold, it is curious that it was Edwin Booth who played the role of Brutus, assassin of Julius Caesar, and the role of Marc Antony was played by John Wilkes Booth, while "lean and hungry" Cassius was given to the heavier built Junius Brutus Booth Jr.

In the handbill promoting the production (right), it stated that there would appear, for one night only, "The Three Sons of the Great Booth."  The three Booth brothers were then listed, from oldest to youngest, Junius, Edwin, and John, and beneath this, the Latin phrase that left no doubt that the entire production was dedicated to their father, the great tragedian Junius Brutus Booth: Filii Patri Digno Digniores.

As their mother watched on from a box on the aisle, the three Booth brothers reenacted the tragedy of Julius Caesar before an audience in The Winter Garden Theatre that was "packed to the rafters."  During the performance the clanging of fire bells could be heard from the streets of New York, as confederate sympathizers during the ongoing American Civil War tried to burn the city to the ground, which included fires set in the Lafarge House, which abutted the rear of The Winter Garden Theatre.  About a half-hour into the performance, during the first scene of Act Two, when Brutus was pacing in his orchard, contemplating his pending assassination of Caesar, the clang and clatter of horse-drawn fire engines could be heard from the street outside.  It seemed that there was a fire next door in the Lafarge House which threatened to engulf The Winter Garden Theatre.  Before panic could consume the audience, Edwin stepped to the footlights to calm the audience.

Julius Caesar and the burning of New York City
The fire at the Lafarge House that almost spread to The Winter Garden Theatre had been set by sympathizers to the cause of the Confederacy with the intention of burning New York to the ground during these, the last months of the Civil War.  At the Lafarge House, someone had set fires in the front parlor and had emptied a bottle of phosphorus on the furniture throughout a room on the third floor.

In describing this "diabolical plot to burn the City of New York," which The New York Times called "one of the most fiendish and inhuman acts known in modern times," it was reported under a banner heading:

THE EXCITEMENT AT WINTER GARDEN
On November 26, 1864, confederate rebels set fire to the Lafarge House. The house was located next to the Winter Garden Theatre, and the rebels had the intention of spreading the fire and burning down New York. A woman was arrested at the Metropolitan Hotel after witnesses had seen her leaving each building right before they caught on fire. She was suspected of using phosphorus to help start the fires and was detained. The fire marshal Baker was in charge of investigating how the fires were started, while police tracked down other suspected people. The New York Times said that this rebel attempt was "one of the most fiendish and inhuman acts known in modern times."

When the alarm of fire was given at the Lafarge the excitement became very intense among the packed mass of human beings in [the] Winter Garden Theatre adjoining the Lafarge, and but for the presence of mind of Mr. BOOTH, who addressed them from the stage of the theatre, telling them there was no danger, it is fearful to think what would have been the result.  There was only the usual number of policemen and watchmen in attendance, and the panic was such for a few moments that it seemed as if all the audience believed the entire building was in flames, and just ready to fall upon their devoted heads.  In addition to what Mr. BOOTH said from the stage, Judge McCLUNN rose in the dress circle, and in a few timely remarks admonished them all to remain quietly in their places, and at the same time tried to show them the danger which would attend a pell-mell rush for the doors, and especially the uselessness of it, inasmuch as the theatre part of the building was known to be on fire.  The presence of a squad of policemen soon after so reassured the audience that with a few exceptions, they remained until the close of the performance.

The city was saved, as was The Winter Garden Theatre. The production of Julius Caesar proceeded. The production was the first – and only – time that the three sons of one of America's great tragedians, Junius Brutus Booth, performed together on the same stage.  The production raised $3,500 for the building of the statue of Shakespeare in Central Park, which stands there today.

The "Hundred Nights Hamlet"

The following night, on November 26, 1864, Booth played the lead role in what became known as the “100 nights Hamlet", a record which stood for fifty-six years.

The Hamlet of Edwin Booth is well documented in reviews and diaries of those who saw the production. One review, appearing in Harper's shortly after the run of "the hundred nights Hamlet" summarized what Edwin Booth had accomplished during this important portrayal - a production which, perhaps more than any other single production in American stage history, solidified one of the great roles in dramatic history with a single actor.  As a critic from the era then wrote: "A really fine actor is as uncommon as a really great dramatic poet. Yet what Garrick was in Richard III or Edmund Kean in Shylock, we are sure Edwin Booth is in Hamlet."

After that, Booth followed his Hamlet marathon on March 23, 1865, with a series of what he called "Grand Revivals": a series of classical dramas sumptuously produced at the Winter Garden that began with a highly acclaimed production of Othello, with Booth in the title role.

After Lincoln’s assassination, Edwin Booth went int a self-imposed retirement and asked president Andrew Johnson for his brother's body and had him buried at Green Mount Cemetery in 1865. Finally, in February 1866, he returned to the stage and played his acclaimed Richelieu, followed in January 1867 by a spectacular production of Merchant of Venice that was considered one of the finest productions of that play during the 19th century.

Demise 
On Saturday, March 23, 1867, a fire broke out under the stage which eventually burned the Winter Garden Theatre to the ground.

A fire broke out about 8:40 o'clock on Saturday morning beneath the stage of the Winter Garden Theatre, resulting in the entire destruction of that establishment, and doing considerable damage to the Southern Hotel, formerly known as the Lafarge House. Although the Fire Department was promptly on hand, in an incredibly short space of time the flames had wrapped the entire interior of the Winter Garden in a sheet of fire, and the firemen were unable to work therein owing to the intense heat...By 9 o'clock the flames had reached their limit and the spectacle was one of peculiar grandeur and effect...At 9:15 the roof of theatre fell...The aggregate loss is roughly estimated at $250,000.  Both the theatre and the hotel are owned by the Lafarge estate, as also the "stock" scenery and properties of the former...Messrs. EDWIN BOOTH and W. STUART also suffer severe losses.  These gentlemen were the joint lessees and managers of the Winter Garden, and their extensive and valuable wardrobes, used in the recent Shakespearean revivals, as well as a large amount of new scenery and properties, were all destroyed by the flames.  These articles were valued at $60,000 and uninsured...Mr. Booth is a heavy loser by the total destruction of his private wardrobe and many valuable presents.  This wardrobe was considered to be the most extensive and valuable one in the possession of any single actor on this continent.

Included in the wardrobe and also lost was  Edwin Booth’s famous Hamlet costume. Rather than rebuild the theatre once again, Booth decided to erect his own theatre twenty blocks uptown on newly fashionable West Twenty-Third Street on the corner of Sixth Avenue, to be called Booth's Theatre.

The site was then occupied by the Grand Central Hotel, and is today the location for the New York University School of Law's Mercer Street Residence.

Names

See also
Winter Garden Theatre - the current theatre

References

Further reading
 Brown, T. Allston. A History of the New York Stage. Vol. 3, Dodd, Mead, and Company, 1903, pp. 446–449.
 Klein, Christopher. Inside John Wilkes Booth’s Famous Family. HISTORY, A&E Television Networks, 2009.
 Osborne, John. In New York City, the Winter Garden Theater Is Destroyed by Fire. House Divided: The Civil War Research Engine at Dickinson College, 1867.
 Rutigliano, Olivia. Fire! A brief history of theater fires in New York City—and the regulations that helped people escape them. Roundtable, Lapham’s Quarterly, 2019.
 The New York Times. The Rebel Plot, Attempt to Burn the City, The Lost Museum Archive, 1864.
 Willis, Richard A. Curtain down on Theatre Fires, Theatre Survey, vol. 13, no. 2, 1972, pp. 60–73.

External links
http://hd.housedivided.dickinson.edu/node/46433 - article about the Winter Garden Theatre burning down in 1867
https://www.ibdb.com/theatre/winter-garden-theatre-1391 - article about how the Winter Garden Theatre started and some of its shows
https://sohorep.org/glossary-the-winter-garden-theatre - article about the history of the Winter Garden Theatre and some of its managers

Former Broadway theatres
Former theatres in Manhattan
Theatres completed in 1850
1850 establishments in New York (state)
1867 disestablishments in the United States
Building and structure fires in New York City
Demolished theatres in New York City
Demolished buildings and structures in Manhattan
1867 fires in the United States
1867 disasters in the United States
Burned buildings and structures in the United States
John M. Trimble buildings
Building collapses in the United States
Building collapses caused by fire